Carl-Erik Skårman (born 1939) is a Swedish politician who served as a member of the Riksdag for Stockholm County from 1998 to 2002 and 2004 to 2006.  He is affiliated with the Moderate Party. From 1989 to 1994, Skårman was a member of the city council of Stockholm.

After having left the Riksdag and Stockholm, he has been active in local politics in Falköping since 2006.

References

1939 births
Living people
Members of the Riksdag from the Moderate Party
Members of the Riksdag 2002–2006